Zakhidnyi Stadium is a multi-purpose stadium in Mariupol, Ukraine.  It is currently used mostly for football matches, and is the home of youth squad of Illichivets (Illichivets-2 Mariupol). The stadium holds 3,206 spectators. The stadium was used in 2009 UEFA European Under-19 Football Championship.

References

2005 establishments in Ukraine
Football venues in Donetsk Oblast
Multi-purpose stadiums in Ukraine
Sport in Mariupol
Sports venues in Donetsk Oblast
FC Mariupol